Bandiera Rossa (Italian for "Red Flag"), often also called Avanti Popolo after its opening words (also to avoid any confusion with The three flags, another socialist song) is one of the most famous songs of the Italian labour movement. It glorifies the red flag, symbol of the socialist and communist movements. The text was written by Carlo Tuzzi in 1908; the melody is taken from two Lombard folk songs.

Versions
Apart from the first Italian text, there are several variants which are identified with certain socialist or communist parties. The last two lines "Evviva il comunismo e la libertà" were put in the text after the rise of Benito Mussolini; at the same time the original beginning "Compagni avanti alla riscossa" was changed to "Avanti o popolo, alla riscossa". Also, the word "comunismo" at the end of the chorus is often replaced with "socialismo", especially in more recent renderings of the song.

Influence on other works

Art music
Bandiera Rossa was notably quoted in Frederic Rzewski's piano works The People United Will Never Be Defeated! and No Place to Go but Around.

In popular culture
Notable covers of the song were made by the Slovenian punk-rock band Pankrti in 1984 on the Rdeči album (Red album), as well as the Croatian punk-rock band KUD Idijoti in 1990, on their album Mi smo ovdje samo zbog para (We are only here for the money). Scottish band, Tarneybackle released a version of the song as part of a medley of Spanish Civil War music. The song also appears on UK punk/oi! band Angelic Upstarts' 2002 album Sons of Sparticus.

The title of the 1986 Israeli film Avanti Popolo  is taken from the song. The film's protagonists – Israeli and Egyptian soldiers, particularly unheroic in their attitudes and actions, wander the Sinai Desert in the aftermath of the 1967 War. In one notable scene, the soldiers facetiously sing the song.

Excerpt from the text

This version translated for marxists.org by Clara Statello and Mitchell Abidor.

Foreign-language versions
One of the most widely known Italian songs, Bandiera Rossa has been rendered in several languages including: English, Croatian, Slovenian, German, French, Swedish, Norwegian, Danish, Turkish, Kurdish, Finnish, Icelandic, Maltese, Russian, Esperanto, Vietnamese and Filipino.

See also 
  – another Italian partisan song
  – another song associated with the Italian partisans
  – another Italian partisan song
  - A Yiddish partisan song popularized during WW2

References

Further reading
 

Political party songs
Italian songs
1908 songs
Socialist songs